Grimme may refer to:

Grimme, village in Saxony-Anhalt
Grimme Award

People
Arnold Grimme, German veterinarian and naturalist
Friedrich Wilhelm Grimme, German writer
Adolf Grimme, German politician
Matthias T. J. Grimme, German author
Stefan Grimme, German chemist
, German scholar of Semitic studies